The natural spin turn is a ballroom dance step used in the waltz.  It is typically used to advance a couple  of a turn down line of dance, although an underturned spin turn is also very useful for turning a corner.  The natural spin turn is also considered an intermediary step toward learning pivots.

Technique

The natural spin turn consists of the first half of a natural turn followed by an under-turned pivot.

Leader (man)

Follower (lady)

Underturned spin

The underturned spin is a useful variation on the natural spin turn that allows a leader to navigate a corner.

References

External links
 

Waltz dance moves